Russell Dickson is the name of:

 Russell Dickson (footballer, born 1964), former Australian rules footballer for Collingwood
 Russell Dickson (footballer, born 1961), former Australian rules footballer for Melbourne
 Russell Dickson (actor), see List of former Coronation Street characters